Agrișu may refer to several places in Romania:

Agrișu de Jos and Agrișu de Sus, villages in Șieu-Odorhei Commune, Bistrița-Năsăud County
Agrișu Mare, a village in Târnova Commune, Arad County
Agrișu Mic, a village in Hășmaș Commune, Arad County

See also
Agriș